William Fowell (died 23 March 1507) of Fowelscombe in the parish of Ugborough in Devon, was a Member of Parliament for Totnes in Devon in 1455.

He was the son and heir of Richard Fowell of Fowelscombe by his wife Mary Walrond, a daughter of William Walrond. He married Elinor Reynell (died 9 April 1507), a daughter of Walter Reynell (fl. 1404) of Malston in the parish of Sherford in Devon, a member of parliament for Devon in 1404. Fowell died on 23 March 1507 and his wife died 16 days later on 9 April 1507. The couple's monument survives in Ugborough Church.

References

Sources
Vivian, Lt.Col. J.L., (Ed.) The Visitations of the County of Devon: Comprising the Heralds' Visitations of 1531, 1564 & 1620. Exeter, 1895.

Further reading
Biography in History of Parliament, Volume 1422-1504, not yet published on-line
Holloway, Estelle, The Fowells of Fowlescombe, published in Devon & Cornwall Notes & Queries, Vol.36:1, 1987, pp. 29–32

1507 deaths
English MPs 1455
Members of the Parliament of England (pre-1707) for Totnes